You're Dead may refer to:

Books
You're Dead, Resolved – Horror High series novel by Nicholas Adams, 1993

Film
You're Dead (film), a 1999 film with Rhys Ifans and John Hurt

Music
You're Dead!, album by electronic musician Flying Lotus, 2014

Songs
"You're Dead", song by The Varukers, 1984
"You're Dead", song by Alkaline Trio from the album From Here to Infirmary, 2001 	
"You're Dead", song by Die Toten Hosen from the album Unsterblich, 2001 
"You're Dead", song by the Wedding Present from the album Valentina, 2012 
"You're Dead", song by Megadeth from the album United Abominations, 2007
"You're Dead", song by Necro (rapper)
"You're Dead", song by Norma Tanega 
"You're Dead", song by Creepy (band), 2007
"Jack, You're Dead!" by Louis Jordan, 2007

See also
 a commonly used parting phrase
 Game over, an English phrase for some video games

English phrases